The Western Infirmary was a teaching hospital situated in the West End of Glasgow, Scotland, that was managed by NHS Greater Glasgow and Clyde. It was opened in 1874 and closed in 2015.

History
After the University of Glasgow moved from the city centre to the West End in the 1870s, distancing itself from the Royal Infirmary, a new teaching hospital was commissioned for the new university site and opened in 1874. The Western Infirmary opened as a voluntary hospital relying upon donations and bequests from members of the public. By 1890 there had already been 877 operations performed in the hospital.

Although the hospital initially had only 150 beds, by 1911 this had increased to over six hundred. In 1936 the decision was taken to establish a medical department. In 1930 a radiology department opened and, in 1936, a new ophthalmology department was officially opened, named the Tennent Memorial, with an entrance on Church Street. In 1938 the research capacity increased with the opening of the Gardiner Institute of Medicine. Taking its name from the family that had gifted almost £25,000 towards its foundation the institute worked in conjunction with the University of Glasgow.

In 1948 with the introduction of the National Health Service the Western Infirmary came under the management of the Glasgow Western Hospitals Board of Management.

A £3.5million two-phase rebuilding programme was authorised by the Glasgow Corporation in June 1962. The 256–bed Phase 1 block was completed in 1974. After the completion of the nearby Gartnavel General Hospital in 1972, Phase 2 was indefinitely postponed in 1975.

In 2002, NHS Greater Glasgow & Clyde announced the results of a three-year consultation, the Greater Glasgow's Acute Services Review, wherein they outlined a £700 million modernisation plan for Glasgow's hospitals. As part of the plan, some services would be transferred to expanded facilities at Gartnavel General Hospital but most of them would be transferred to new facilities at the Queen Elizabeth University Hospital site. By 2010 the Western Infirmary had only 493 inpatient beds.

In autumn 2015, the Western Infirmary closed with the exception of the minor injuries unit. At the end of 2015 the Minor Injuries Unit moved a short distance to the Yorkhill Hospital site and the Western Infirmary closed completely on 6 December 2015.

In accordance with a commitment given by the hospital to the University in 1878 that the site would be offered back to the University if it was no longer required for healthcare, the University exercised its right to acquire the site and plans to redevelop it were approved in February 2017.

Services
There was a Maggie's centre at the hospital to help cancer patients, as well as the Glasgow Clinical Research Facility.

References

External links

 Celebrating a Proud History: The Western Infirmary 1874−2015 on the NHS Greater Glasgow and Clyde website

Hospital buildings completed in 1874
Hospital buildings completed in 1974
Defunct hospitals in Scotland
Hospitals in Glasgow
Teaching hospitals in Scotland
Voluntary hospitals
2015 disestablishments in Scotland
Partick